The 1938 Gent–Wevelgem was the fifth edition of the Gent–Wevelgem cycle race and was held on 2 June 1938. The race started in Ghent and finished in Wevelgem. The race was won by Hubert Godart.

General classification

References

Gent–Wevelgem
1938 in road cycling
1938 in Belgian sport
June 1938 sports events